Cecilie Leganger (born 12 March 1975) is a Norwegian retired handballer who played for the Norwegian national team.

International championships
Leganger made her debut on the Norwegian national team in 1993, 17 years old, and retired three years later, only 20. In 1993 she obtained bronze medal at the World Women's Handball Championship, being voted as Best Goalkeeper and Most Valuable Player at the championship. At the European Championship in 1994, she was voted best goalkeeper.
At the 1995 World Championship she was again voted Best Goalkeeper. After a one-year break she made comeback as a club player, but did not play on the national team until the 1998 European Championship, winning gold medal with the Norwegian team and voted as best keeper in the championship. World Champion in 1999, again voted best keeper. She received bronze medal at the Olympic Championships in Sydney 2000. At the World Championship in 2001 she voted again the best keeper.

Club player
As a club player she is Norwegian Champion from 1999 (with Bækkelaget), Slovenian Champion from 2004 (with Krim Ljubljana), Danish Champion from 2005 (with Slagelse), and Women's EHF Champion in 2004/05 and 2006/07. She played for Larvik HK from 2010 until 2014 which would be the last club she played for before retiring. She is considered by many as one of the best goalkeepers of all time.

Individual awards
All-Star Goalkeeper of the World Championship: 1993, 1995, 1999 and 2001
Most Valuable Player of the World Championship: 1993
All-Star Goalkeeper of the European Championship: 1994 and 1998
All-Star Goalkeeper of Gildeserien: 1999/2000, 2000/2001 and 2001/2002
IHF World Player of the Year: 2001
Goalkeeper of the Year: 2004/2005, 2005/2006, 2006/2007, 2007/2008 and 2008/2009 in the Danish League
Player of the Year in the Danish League: 2007 (selected by the players' committee)
All-Star Goalkeeper of Postenligaen: 2010/2011 and 2011/2012
Norwegian national goalkeeper of all time
Norwegian female handball player of all time

References

External links

1975 births
Living people
Norwegian female handball players
Expatriate handball players
Norwegian expatriate sportspeople in Denmark
Norwegian expatriate sportspeople in Slovenia
Expatriate sportspeople in Slovenia
Olympic handball players of Norway
Olympic bronze medalists for Norway
Handball players at the 2000 Summer Olympics
Sportspeople from Bergen
Olympic medalists in handball
Medalists at the 2000 Summer Olympics